The Police and Border Guard Board is a unified national governmental agency within the Estonian Ministry of Interior and is responsible for law enforcement and internal security in the Republic of Estonia.

The main tasks of the agency are to ensure and protect the integrity of the Estonian state and, since May 1, 2004, also the European Union border within the territories of the Republic of Estonia; to secure the state borders and the European Union outer border within the territories of the Republic of Estonia, to monitor and identify citizenship, along with handling the documentation, to preserve law and civil order within the borders of the Republic of Estonia and to detect and prevent crime.

History
Andrus Ansip's Government Cabinet which was established after the 2005 parliamentary elections, stated in its 2007–2011 coalition programme the need for a unified homeland security agency in order to reduce operating costs and upkeep between the ministry and its organizations. On April 13, 2007, the Ministry of the Interior established a working group in order commence research about possible unification of the Estonian Police and Estonian Border Guard agencies.

The final study presented by the working group proposed to unite three main law enforcement organizations, including the Police, Border Guard, and the Citizenship and Migration Board into a single structure capable of carrying out all the tasks. In October 2007, the Ministry of the Interior created another working group with an operational task to start the unification process. On August 31, 2008, the Cabinet approved the creation of a new government organization within the Ministry of the Interior with the unification of these three agencies.

On May 6, 2009, the Estonian Parliament recognized the agency unification idea with the adoption of the Police and Border Guard Board Law, and changes into other laws regarding the area of competency of the Ministry. In June, the Cabinet appointed Raivo Küüt to be the first director-general of the organization. On January 1, 2010, the Police and Border Guard Board officially started work.

Structure 
The agency is headed by a director general, who has four deputies. The deputies lead various departments. In addition, prefectures are led by prefects. The Police and Border Guard consists of the Development Department, Border Guard Department, Central Criminal Police, Northern Prefecture, Eastern Prefecture, Southern Prefecture, Western Prefecture, Administration, Internal Affairs Office, and Internal Audit Office. The Border Guard Department also manages the Police and Border Guard Aviation Group and the naval fleet.

Personnel 
The organization has more than 7,000 servicemen, of which 6,000 are in active duty, and another 1,000 in the administrative area.

Ranks

The head of the Police Board is the Director General of Police (peadirektor). The head of the regional district is the Police Commissioner (prefekt). With the unification of the Police and Border Guard Boards several new service ranks were created which now also includes the ranks of general and an inspector general.

Equipment 
 High and non-visibility stab vests used to prevent stab wounds and gunshots,
 Telescopic Baton,
 Taser,
 Handcuffs,
 Communications System (Radio).
 Pistol Glock 19
 Pistol Walther P99
 Rifle LMT R-20

Aircraft 

The Police and Border Guard Aviation Group operates fixed and rotary-wing aircraft for the Police and Border Guard Board. In total, they operate three helicopters and two airplanes. One of the airplanes is equipped for maritime patrol and pollution detection duties.

Naval fleet 
In 2023, the naval fleet was merged with the Estonian Navy. As a result, the Police and Border Guard Board only operates small vessels.

Insignia

Police coat of arms 
The coat of arms of the police is in the shape of a shield. On a blue background is a silver lion standing on its rear legs, holding a small coat of arms withs paws, which represents readiness to protect public order and the interests of the state. The lion was chosen as a symbol because it represents nobility and courage and because it is also represented on the national coat of arms. The silver color symbolizes nobility and masculinity, while the blue color symbolizes peace and stability. The coat of arms was designed based on historical traditions and the design of the Estonian police badge from 1930s.

Border Guard insignia 
The insignia of the Estonian Border Guard was designed by Günther Reindorff for the 10th anniversary of the Border Guard in 1932. It depicts a silver eagle holding a sword in front of a border post. The eagle is called the North Eagle, which originates from the national epic Kalevipoeg, and it symbolizes vigilance, courage and readiness to fight. The border post is stylized in diagonally placed national colors and it holds the national coat of arms at the top. The eagle and border post are surrounded by a wreath of silver oak leaves, which symbolizes unity and manliness. There is a silver ribbon with the date of establishment of the Estonian Border Guard on the lower part of insignia.

Flag 
The main color of the Police and Border Guard flag is blue, which is also one of the colors of the national flag. On the agency board the blue symbolises peace and stability. The main figure on the flag is a white standing lion holding a national small coat of arms with its paws. The lions tongue and claws are red. The flag design is based on the Estonian police coat of arms. The length and width ratio of the festive parade flag is 7:9 and the size of the flag is 105x135 cm.

See also
 Estonian Police
 Estonian Border Guard
 Estonian Rescue Board
 Estonian Internal Security Service
 IT and Development Centre. Ministry of the Interior, Estonia
 Crime in Estonia

References

External links

 The Law of the Estonian Police and Border Guard Board

 
Border control
Borders of Estonia
Law enforcement agencies of Estonia